Type 79 may refer to:
 Type 69/79 Chinese tank
 Type 79 100 mm naval gun
 Type 79 Jyu-MAT
 Type 79 rifle, a Chinese clone of the Dragunov sniper rifle
 Type 79 submachine gun
 Bristol Ten-seater, variant Type 79
 Type 79 radar, the Royal Navy's first operational radar